The TeraSun Energy Solar Power Station is a planned 81 megawatts solar power plant in Namibia. The power station is owned and is being developed by a consortium comprising Natura Energy, a Namibia-based energy company and Globleq Africa Limited, an independent power producer (IPP), headquartered in the United Kingdom.

The developers of this solar farm intend to sell the electricity directly to commercial customers in Namibia, through the transmission network of NamPower, the national electricity utility company, as permissible by the recent changes in the laws of the country.

Location

History
Namibia's Natura Energy, through its subsidiary TeraSun Energy, has been developing this power station on its own since circa 2018. At that time a 50 MW installation was being considered at an estimated cost of US$63.2 million.

In 2021, Natura Energy convinced Globeleq Africa to become a shareholder in the project. Globeleq Africa is an IPP based in the United Kingdom with knowledge and experience in energy generation, transmission, distribution, marketing and financing in Africa. The capacity of the power station was increased from the original 50 MW to 81 MW. The cost of construction also went up from US$63.2 million to US$69.8 million.

Developers
TeraSun Energy is the special purpose vehicle (SPV) created by the power station developers to design, own, build, operate and maintain this power station. The ownership of the SPV company is as illustrated in the table below.

Timeline
Construction is expected to start in 2022, with commercial commissioning anticipated in 2023.

See also

List of power stations in Namibia

References

External links
 Natura Energy Inks N$1 Billion Agreement With UK Company For Developing An 81 MW Solar Plant In Arandis

Solar power stations in Namibia
Buildings and structures in Erongo Region
Proposed power stations in Namibia